Calvin Anele Ngcongca (21 October 1987 – 23 November 2020) was a South African professional footballer who played as a right back.

Career
On 29 August 2015, Ngcongca joined ES Troyes AC on a season-long loan from Genk after being relegated to the bench by his head coach.

On 23 November 2020, Anele Ngcongca died in a car accident on the N2 highway in KwaZulu-Natal. He played for AmaZulu before his death.

Honours
Genk
 Belgian Cup: 2008–09, 2012–13
 Belgian Pro League: 2010–11
 Belgian Super Cup: 2011

Mamelodi Sundowns
 PSL: 2017–18, 2018–19, 2019–20
 Nedbank Cup: 2019–20
 Telkom Knockout: 2019

References

External links
 
 
 Anele Ngcongca Loaned to Amazulu

1987 births
2020 deaths
Sportspeople from Cape Town
South African soccer players
Association football midfielders
Western Province United F.C. players
K.R.C. Genk players
ES Troyes AC players
K.S.V. Roeselare players
Mamelodi Sundowns F.C. players
Belgian Pro League players
South Africa international soccer players
2010 FIFA World Cup players
2013 Africa Cup of Nations players
2015 Africa Cup of Nations players
South African expatriate soccer players
South African expatriate sportspeople in Belgium
Expatriate footballers in Belgium
Road incident deaths in South Africa